HMDA may refer to:
 Home Mortgage Disclosure Act
 Hyderabad Metropolitan Development Authority, an expanded urban planning agency of the city of Hyderabad, India
 Hexamethylenediamine, an industrial chemical
 Hospital corpsman dental assistant